Brachmia tholeromicta is a moth in the family Gelechiidae. It was described by Edward Meyrick in 1931. It is found in Sierra Leone.

References

Moths described in 1931
Brachmia
Taxa named by Edward Meyrick
Moths of Africa